The 1984 Korfball World Championship was the second edition of the major international korfball competition. It was held in Belgium on April 24–27, in the cities of Antwerp, Louvain la Neuve, Hasselt and Ghent. The Netherlands defeated Belgium at the final by 11–9.

Pool matches
Legend

Final round

7th–8th places

5th–6th places

Bronze medal match

Final

Final standings

Korfball World Championship
Korfball World Championship
IKF World Korfball Championship
International sports competitions hosted by Belgium
Korfball in Belgium